During the 1980–81 English football season, Everton F.C. competed in the Football League First Division. They finished 15th in the table with 36 points.

Final league table

Results

Football League First Division

FA Cup

League Cup

Squad
Bob Latchford

References

Everton F.C. seasons
Everton
Everton F.C. season